

Willibald Utz (20 January 1893 – 20 April 1954) was a German general during World War II who commanded several divisions. He was a recipient of the Knight's Cross of the Iron Cross.

Life and career
Willibald Utz was born in Furth im Wald in Bavaria on 20 January 1893. In 1913, at the age of 20, he entered the Bavarian Army as an ensign, and by September 1914 he had been commissioned lieutenant. After serving in World War I he joined the inter-war Reichswehr. By the outbreak of World War II in 1939 he was commander of the 100th (mountain) (Gebirgsjäger) Regiment, and was awarded the Knight's Cross of the Iron Cross for his leadership of this regiment during the invasion of Crete during May and June 1941.

In April 1943, Utz was appointed commander of the newly reconstituted 100th Jäger Division, which had been destroyed at the end of the Battle of Stalingrad. Promoted to major general (generalmajor) on 1 July 1943, he held his command on the Eastern Front from March to December 1944.

Now a lieutenant general (generalleutnant), he took over command of the 2nd Mountain Division on 9 February 1945 when its previous commander was wounded. After fighting on the Western Front in the Saar-Moselle Triangle, his new command, earlier in the war considered an elite unit, was well below strength and combat effectiveness. The division finished the war in Württemberg where Utz surrendered it to the Western Allies.

Awards and decorations

 Knight's Cross of the Iron Cross on 21 June 1941 as Oberst (colonel) and commander of Gebirgs-Jäger-Regiment 100 during the Battle of Crete.

Notes

References

 

1893 births
1954 deaths
Lieutenant generals of the German Army (Wehrmacht)
German Army personnel of World War I
Recipients of the Gold German Cross
Recipients of the Knight's Cross of the Iron Cross
Recipients of the clasp to the Iron Cross, 1st class
People from Furth im Wald
People from the Kingdom of Bavaria
Battle of Crete
Military personnel from Bavaria
German Army generals of World War II
Gebirgsjäger of World War II